Odozana margina is a moth of the subfamily Arctiinae. It was described by Schaus in 1896. It is found in the Brazilian state of Paraná, Peru and Bolivia.

References

Lithosiini
Moths described in 1896